Mammadali Mehdiyev (born  9 April 1993) is an Azerbaijani judoka who competed at the 2015 World Championships and 2016 Summer Olympics.Participant of the Rio 2016 and Tokyo 2020 Olympic Games.

He won the silver medal in his event at the 2022 Judo Grand Slam Paris held in Paris, France. He won the gold medal in his event at the 2022 Judo Grand Slam Tel Aviv held in Tel Aviv, Israel.

References

External links

 
 
 
 
 

1993 births
Living people
Azerbaijani male judoka
Judoka at the 2016 Summer Olympics
Olympic judoka of Azerbaijan
Universiade medalists in judo
Universiade bronze medalists for Azerbaijan
Judoka at the 2019 European Games
European Games medalists in judo
European Games bronze medalists for Azerbaijan
Medalists at the 2013 Summer Universiade
Judoka at the 2020 Summer Olympics
20th-century Azerbaijani people
21st-century Azerbaijani people